Underwater sports, for the 2013 Bolivarian Games, took place from 17 November to 29 November 2013. The three sports chosen for these Games were finswimming, free-diving and spearfishing. The two free-diving events was contested at the Sports complex Mansiche's pool.  The long distance finswimming was held at Salaverry. Spearfishing events were held in waters north of the island of San Lorenzo located to the west of Callao.

Medal table
Key:

Medalists

References

2013
Finswimming at multi-sport events
Freediving
Events at the 2013 Bolivarian Games